Government Arts College for Women, Krishnagiri, is a general degree college located in Krishnagiri, Tamil Nadu. It was established in the year 1992. The college is affiliated with Periyar University. This college offers different courses in arts, commerce and science.

Departments

Science
Chemistry
Mathematics
Biochemistry
Computer Science

Arts and Commerce
Tamil
English
Corporate Secretaryship

Accreditation
The college is  recognized by the University Grants Commission (UGC).

References

External links

Educational institutions established in 1992
1992 establishments in Tamil Nadu
Colleges affiliated to Periyar University